Raux is a surname. Notable people with the surname include:

Auguste Raux (born 1954), French football coach 
Corinne Raux (born 1976), French duathlete
Damien Raux (born 1984), French ice hockey player 
KickRaux, Jamaican DJ, record producer, songwriter and music executive

See also
Rauf